Asiza is an Asian surname. Notable people with the surname include:

Fahri Asiza, Indonesian novelist and teacher
Manish Asiza (born 1964), Indian politician

See also
 Aziza (disambiguation)

Surnames of Asian origin